Parramatta High School (abbreviated as PHS) is a government-funded co-educational dual modality partially academically selective and comprehensive secondary day school, located on the Great Western Highway in the central business district of Parramatta, a western suburb of Sydney, New South Wales, Australia.

Established in 1913, the school was the first co-educational school in the Sydney metropolitan area and was previously a fully selective high school. Since 2013, it has been partially selective in the Parramatta region with a high multicultural student base. The school is operated by the New South Wales Department of Education and has over 1000 students from Year 7 to Year 12. The school ranked 93rd in 2019 for the NSW Higher School Certificate.

House system
At the beginning of Year 7, all Parramatta High students are placed in one of the following four houses:

Every year, there are two sporting carnivals which include athletics and swimming. There are two advanced carnivals, including zone and/or regional by which students compete to earn their house points. The winning house of each carnival and overall championship is announced each year.

History 

At a cost of A£13,000, Parramatta High School was officially opened by Campbell Carmichael, the Minister of Public Instruction, on Monday, 22 February 1913. In 2013 Parramatta High School celebrated its centenary, marking 100 years since its establishment on 28 January 1913. Class of 2018, the 100th cohort to enrol at Parramatta High School, acknowledged this by implementing the Phoenix on the back of their year 12 jerseys. The Phoenix is a well-known symbol of Parramatta High, which derived from the 1940s Phoenix Magazine, and is celebrated through the annual PHS Phoenix Week.

Notable alumni
 John Benaudcricketer
 Richie Benaudcricketer
 Cardinal Edward Idris Cassidyhigh-ranking Vatican official
 Philip K. Chapmanfirst Australian-born American Apollo astronaut
 Manu Crooksmusician
 Harry Hopmantennis player
 Bede Morrisimmunologist
 Ted Noffstheologian
 Chips Raffertyactor
 W. E. H. Stanneranthropologist
 Rod Tayloractor
 Sir Cyril WalshJustice of the High Court of Australia
 George Weirpolitician

See also

 List of government schools in New South Wales
 List of selective high schools in New South Wales
 Selective school (New South Wales)

References

External links
Parramatta High School Website
 

Public high schools in Sydney
Selective schools in New South Wales
Educational institutions established in 1913
Schools in Parramatta
1913 establishments in Australia